Congo at the 2008 Summer Olympics may refer to:

Republic of the Congo at the 2008 Summer Olympics
Democratic Republic of the Congo at the 2008 Summer Olympics